Luciano Riccardo Ligabue (born 13 March 1960), commonly known as Ligabue or Liga, is an Italian  singer-songwriter, film director and writer.

Biography
Ligabue was born in Correggio, in the province of Reggio Emilia (Emilia-Romagna in northern Italy). Before becoming a successful singer, he held various jobs, working in agriculture and in factories. He entered the music world in 1987 when he founded the amateur band Orazero. For this band, he wrote several original songs, with which they participated in several local and national contests. The following year his fellow Emilian singer-songwriter Pierangelo Bertoli was the first to discover Ligabue's writing talents, and included one of Ligabue's songs, "Sogni di Rock'n'Roll" ("Rock n roll dreams"), in his new LP.

The following year Bertoli introduced him to producer Angelo Carrara, to finish an LP of his own, Ligabue, which was released in May 1990. Ligabue soon gained fame as one of the most successful Italian rock stars, finding fans mainly among younger audiences. His most famous hits include Balliamo sul mondo (Let's Dance on the World), Ho perso le parole (I've lost words) and the most successful of all, Certe Notti (Certain Nights), which was voted as "Italian song of the 1990s" in a poll held by a popular music magazine. He also collaborated with another famous singer-songwriter, Francesco Guccini, who also had a part in Ligabue's first movie.

Ligabue directed his first movie, Radiofreccia, in 1998, a semi-autobiographical story of a local radio station. Critics acclaimed it as surprisingly well shot for a newcomer, and the film received three David di Donatello Awards (the highest award in Italian cinema). He also composed the soundtrack. Four years later he shot Da zero a dieci ("From Zero to Ten"): however, it was not as well-received as the first work, by both critics and fans.

On 10 September 2005, Ligabue held a concert in Reggio Emilia to celebrate his first 15 years of activity. The audience of around 180,000 set a European audience record for the one, non-free event for a single artist. However, due to problems with the audio system, several thousand people were unable to listen to the music and left the concert early. Ligabue later apologized for the problems.

Ligabue has also published a short story collection, Fuori e dentro il Borgo ("In and out the village"), which won several literary awards, a science fiction novel La neve se ne frega ("Snow doesn't care") (2005), and collections of poems Lettere d'Amore nel frigo ("Love Letters in the fridge") (2006).

He considers himself a "believer", even if he shows strong criticism towards the traditional teachings of the Catholic Church.

He is a passionate Inter Milan fan.

Political involvement
In the 1980s Ligabue was a member of the communal council of his native Correggio, elected for the Italian Communist Party. Though he no longer assumes a public high-level political position, Ligabue, together with Jovanotti and Piero Pelù, released in 1999 the single "Il mio nome è mai più" ("My Name Is Never Again"), a song against the Kosovo War to collect funds for the Italian NGO Emergency.

Discography

Ligabue (1990)
Lambrusco coltelli rose & popcorn (1991)
Sopravvissuti e sopravviventi (1993)
A che ora è la fine del mondo? (1994)
Buon compleanno Elvis! (1995)
Su e giù da un palco (1997)
Radiofreccia (1998)
Miss Mondo (1999)
Fuori come va? (2002)
Giro d'Italia (2003)
Nome e Cognome (2005)
Primo tempo (2007)
Secondo tempo (2008)
Sette notti in Arena (2009)
Arrivederci, mostro! (2010)
Campovolo 2.011 (2011)
Mondovisione (2013)
Giro Del Mondo (2015)
Made in Italy (2016)
Start (2019)
7 (2020)

Tour and live

Filmography

Bibliography
Fuori e dentro il Borgo ("In and out the village") (1997)
La neve se ne frega ("Snow doesn't care") (2004)
Lettere d'amore nel frigo ("Love Letters in the fridge") (2006)
Made in Italy (2018)

References

External links

[ Ligabue on AllMusic.com]

1960 births
Living people
People from Correggio, Emilia-Romagna
Italian deists
Italian rock singers
Italian singer-songwriters
Italian male singers
Italian film directors
Italian male writers
David di Donatello winners
Nastro d'Argento winners
Ciak d'oro winners